Popeye's Voyage: The Quest for Pappy is a 2004 computer-animated Christmas television special produced by Mainframe Entertainment for Lions Gate Entertainment and King Features Entertainment, in association with Nuance Productions. The special, created to coincide with the 75th anniversary of the Popeye the Sailor comic strip character from E. C. Segar's Thimble Theatre, first aired on Fox on December 17, 2004, and was rebroadcast on the same network on December 30, 2005.

Plot
Popeye is on a quest to find his missing father Poopdeck Pappy. Popeye is dogged by nightmares warning him that his Pappy, who abandoned him as a child, is in danger and needs him, so he bravely sets out on the open sea to find his long-lost father and reunite with him for the Christmas holidays. Accompanied by the admiring Olive Oyl, the brawny Bluto, the hungry Wimpy, and little Swee'Pea, he heads for the Sea of Mystery, which happens to be in the evil Sea Hag's domain. Strange things begin to happen along the way, as the group encounters sirens, serpents, and menacing mists. This was clearly all of the Sea Hag's attempts to destroy Popeye for good.

Cast
 Billy West as Popeye and Poopdeck Pappy
 Tabitha St. Germain as Olive Oyl and Swee'Pea
 Garry Chalk as Bluto
 Sanders Whiting as J. Wellington Wimpy 
 Kathy Bates as Siren and Sea Hag

Production
Originally this special was going to be a Claymation feature by Will Vinton, but due to Vinton losing his studio due to financial reasons in 2002 the special was picked up by Mainframe Entertainment.

Billy West described the production as "the hardest job I ever did, ever" and the voice of Popeye as "like a buzzsaw in your throat."

See also
 List of Christmas films

References

External links

 
 

2000s American animated films
2000s fantasy adventure films
2004 computer-animated films
2004 films
2000s Christmas films
American children's animated comedy films
American children's animated adventure films
American children's animated fantasy films
American fantasy adventure films
American fantasy comedy films
Animated Christmas films
Canadian animated fantasy films
Films set in 1939
Films scored by Mark Mothersbaugh
American computer-animated films
Canadian computer-animated films
Fox television specials
Christmas television specials
Rainmaker Studios films
Lionsgate animated films
Popeye
American Christmas television specials
2000s Canadian films
2000s English-language films
English-language Canadian films